Tasley is a civil parish in Shropshire, England. It contains three listed buildings that are recorded in the National Heritage List for England. All the listed buildings are designated at Grade II, the lowest of the three grades, which is applied to "buildings of national importance and special interest". The parish, which is to the west of Bridgnorth, contains the small village of Tasley, some suburban housing on the edge of Bridgnorth, and is otherwise rural farmland and isolated farms. The listed buildings are a church, a house, and a former farmhouse converted into cottages.


Buildings

References

Citations

Sources

Lists of buildings and structures in Shropshire